Charles Joseph McBride (10 April 1925 – 3 October 2013) was a New Zealand rugby league player who represented New Zealand.

Early life
McBride was born in Greymouth. He was educated at the Marist Brothers School, Greymouth.

Playing career
McBride played for the Blackball and Marist clubs in the West Coast Rugby League competition. He played for both the West Coast and the South Island. He was first selected for the New Zealand national rugby league team in 1946 and toured Great Britain and France in 1947 and Australia in 1948. In 1951 he got bitten during a "brutal match" between the Kiwis and the touring French. He played twenty one tests between 1946 and 1952. He was inducted into the New Zealand Rugby League's Legends of League in 2000.

References

1925 births
2013 deaths
New Zealand rugby league players
New Zealand national rugby league team players
West Coast rugby league team players
Place of birth missing
Rugby league second-rows
South Island rugby league team players
Blackball players
Marist (West Coast) players
20th-century New Zealand people
People educated at John Paul II High School, Greymouth